Botkul is a bittern salt lake in the Kazakhstan–Russia border.

There is no salt mining at the lake. Its waters have a bitter, stinging taste and a strong smell of hydrogen sulfide. The authorities are exploring the potential of developing Botkul as a tourist attraction.

Geography
The main river feeding its waters is the Solyonaya, a small stream flowing from the west. The lake is shallow and in years of drought it dries completely up. 

Botkul is surrounded by salt marshes. The Kazakhstan–Russia border runs across the middle of the lake from NNE to SSW. The western part of the lake lies in Pallasovsky District, Volgograd Oblast, Russian Federation and the eastern in Bokey Orda District, West Kazakhstan Region, Kazakhstan. Saykyn, located to the northeast, is the nearest village.

See also
List of lakes of Kazakhstan
List of lakes of Russia

References

External links

Tourism and recreational potential of the salt lakes of Western Kazakhstan

Lakes of Kazakhstan
Lakes of Volgograd Oblast
Endorheic lakes of Asia
West Kazakhstan Region